Giger is a surname. Notable people with the surname include:

 Albert Giger (born 1946), Swiss cross-country skier
 Fabrice Giger (born 1965), Swiss publisher and film producer
 H. R. Giger (1940–2014), Swiss painter, sculptor, and set designer
 Paul Giger (born 1952),  Swiss violinist and composer
 Peter Giger (born 1939), Swiss percussionist and bandleader
 Walter Giger (born 1943), Swiss environmental chemist
 Werner Giger (1949–1974), Swiss motorcycle racer

See also 
 Geiger
 Fiedler

Swiss-German surnames